Wolfgang Jerat (9 February 1955 – 10 July 2020) was a German footballer who became a coach. His son Tim Jerat is a professional footballer.

Jerat was born in Cologne and died in Ghana on 10 July 2020.

References

1955 births
2020 deaths
German footballers
Association football defenders
SV Bergisch Gladbach 09 players
German football managers
1. FC Köln managers
Wuppertaler SV managers
Bonner SC managers
FC Prishtina managers
FC Viktoria Köln managers
FK Baník Most managers
German expatriate football managers
German expatriate sportspeople in Kosovo
German expatriate sportspeople in the Czech Republic
Footballers from Cologne